"The Geranium" is an early short story by the American author Flannery O'Connor. It was first published in Accent: A Quarterly of New Literature in 1946 and is one of the six stories included in O'Connor's 1947 master's thesis The Geranium: A Collection of Short Stories. It later appeared in the 1971 collection The Complete Stories.

O'Connor was fond of the story and rewrote it into "An Exile in the East" (1954), "Getting Home" (1964), and "Judgement Day" (1964). As "Judgement Day," it appeared as the final story of Everything That Rises Must Converge in 1965. All four versions of the story were published together in Flannery O'Connor: The Growing Craft in 1993.

References
Giroux, Robert. Introduction and notes. The Complete Stories. By Flannery O'Connor. New York: Farrar, Straus and Giroux, 1971.

Further reading

Asals, Frederick. Flannery O' Connor: The Imagination of Extremity. Athens: U of Georgia P, 1982.

Darretta, John Lawrence. "From 'The Geranium' to 'Judgement Day': Retribution in the Fiction of Flannery O'Connor." Since Flannery O'Connor: Essays on the Contemporary American Short Story. Ed. Loren Logsdon and Charles W. Mayer. Macomb: Western Illinois UP, 1987. 21–28.

Giannone, Richard. "Flannery O'Connor's Consecration of the End." Since Flannery O'Connor: Essays on the Contemporary American Short Story. Ed. Loren Logsdon and Charles W. Mayer. Macomb: Western Illinois UP, 1987. 9–20.
Gretlund, Jan Nordby. "Flannery O'Connor's 'An Exile in the East': An Introduction." South Carolina Review 11.1 (1978): 3–11.
Larsen, Val. "Manor House and Tenement: Failed Communities South and North in 'The Geranium.'" Flannery O'Connor Bulletin 20 (1991): 88–103.

Westarp, Karl-Heinz. "Flannery O'Connor's Development: An Analysis of the Judgment-Day Material." Realist of Distances: Flannery O'Connor Revisited. Aarhus, Denmark: Aarhus UP, 1987. 46–54.
———, comp. Flannery O'Connor: The Growing Craft. Southern Literary Ser. 4. Birmingham, AL: Summa, 1993.
Whitt, Margaret. "Letters to Corinth: Echoes from Greece to Georgia in O'Connor's 'Judgment Day.'" Literature and Belief 17.1–2 (1997): 61–74.
Wood, Ralph C. "From Fashionable Tolerance to Unfashionable Redemption: A Reading of Flannery O'Connor's First and Last Stories." Flannery O'Connor Bulletin 7 (1978): 10–25.

Wray, Virginia F. "Flannery O'Connor's Master's Thesis: Looking for Some Gestures." Flannery O'Connor Bulletin 8 (1979): 68–76.

Short stories by Flannery O'Connor
1946 short stories